The United States Highway 61 Arch is an arch which crosses U.S. Route 61 (US 61) at the Arkansas–Missouri state line, between Blytheville, Arkansas and Steele. The concrete horseshoe arch reads "Entering Arkansas" on one side and "Entering Missouri" on the other. The Mississippi County, Arkansas Road Improvement District built the arch in 1924 after paving the highway; it erected a similar arch over the highway at the Crittenden County line, but the other arch was removed in the 1950s. At the time, the highway was called the North–South Road, and it was already a major route between St. Louis, Missouri and Memphis, Tennessee; the next year, it was designated as part of US 61. The arch is the only archway over a U.S. Highway in Arkansas.

The arch was added to the National Register of Historic Places on October 28, 2001.

See also

 Dual State Monument: monument on the Arkansas-Louisiana border
 OKKAMO Tri-State Marker: monument on the Arkansas-Missouri-Oklahoma tripoint
 National Register of Historic Places listings in Mississippi County, Arkansas
 National Register of Historic Places listings in Pemiscot County, Missouri

References

Transportation buildings and structures on the National Register of Historic Places in Arkansas
Transportation buildings and structures on the National Register of Historic Places in Missouri
Buildings and structures completed in 1924
U.S. Route 61
National Register of Historic Places in Pemiscot County, Missouri
National Register of Historic Places in Mississippi County, Arkansas
Road transportation buildings and structures on the National Register of Historic Places
Blytheville, Arkansas
1924 establishments in Arkansas
1924 establishments in Missouri
Borders of Arkansas
Borders of Missouri
Boundary markers
Monuments and memorials on the National Register of Historic Places in Arkansas